Slovenská Kajňa is a village and municipality in Vranov nad Topľou District in the Prešov Region of eastern Slovakia.

History
In historical records the village was first mentioned in 1323.

Geography
The municipality lies at an altitude of 142 metres and covers an area of 6.729 km². It has a population of about 783 people.

Gallery

Notable people
 Marcel Matanin is a former long-distance runner, who represented his native country in the men's marathon at the 2004 Summer Olympics in Athens, Greece. There he finished in 81st and last place, clocking a total time of 2:50:26 hours. On 23 April 2006 Matanin won the Leipzig Marathon in 2:19:33 hours. Matanin was a former mayor of Slovenská Kajňa (from 1 January 2007 to 31 December 2010). Currently he is a sporting director of the ČSOB Bratislava Marathon.
 Tomáš Oslovič is a Slovak football defender who currently plays for Landesliga Bayern-Mitte club 1. FC Bad Kötzting in Germany. His former clubs were MFK Vranov nad Topľou, Czech 1. FC Karlovy Vary and German clubs SV Schwarzhofen e.V,  SV Mitterteich.

External links
 
 
http://www.statistics.sk/mosmis/eng/run.html

References

Villages in Slovakia
Villages and municipalities in Vranov nad Topľou District
Zemplín (region)